Geoffrey Albert Kirwan Collins (16 May 1909 – 7 August 1968) was an English cricketer active from 1928 to 1934 who played for Sussex County Cricket Club between 1928 and 1934.

Collins was born at Hove in Sussex and educated at Lancing College where he played in the school cricket team. In his final year at school he made four centuries, including a score of 212, and went on to make his first-class cricket debut for Sussex later in the same season. As a schoolboy, Collins was described as "making all the strokes" with his only major defect being "an occasional failure in patience".

He appeared in 50 first-class matches between 1928 and 1934 as a right-handed batsman, scoring 1,140 runs with a highest score of 90 runs. As well as playing for Sussex he made one first-class appearance for MCC in 1931, but after 1934 his business commitments restricted him to playing club cricket. As well as playing cricket, Collins also played football for Lancing Old Boys and Corinthian Casuals F.C.

During World War II Collins joined the Royal Artillery from the Honourable Artillery Company. He reached the rank of Lt. Col. with 90 Heavy Anti-Aircraft Regiment and served in the North-West Europe Campaign of 1944–45, including the Liberation of Antwerp and crossing the Rhine.  He was awarded a Military Cross in 1946. He died suddenly in August 1969 at Hove aged 59.

References

External links

1909 births
1968 deaths
English cricketers
Sussex cricketers
Marylebone Cricket Club cricketers
British Army personnel of World War II
Honourable Artillery Company officers
Royal Artillery officers
Recipients of the Military Cross